John Richard Buckland (3 August 1819 – 13 October 1874), was an Australian school teacher and first headmaster of The Hutchins School, Tasmania.

Buckland was the son of the Rev. John Buckland, Rector of Templeton, Devonshire, and a nephew of Dr. William Buckland, Dean of Westminster. He received his early education from his father at Laleham, and was then sent to Rugby School, of which school his uncle, Dr. Arnold, was at the time head master. At the age of seventeen he went to the University of Oxford, where he held a studentship at Christ Church.

After taking his degree Buckland determined to emigrate to the colonies, and sailed for New Zealand, but in consequence of the unsettled state of affairs in that colony he removed to Tasmania, arriving in Hobart in February 1843. He was for a time second master of the Queen's School, of which the Rev. John Philip Gell was head master. On the closing of that school he opened a private school. In 1845 he was ordained. In 1846 the prospectus of a Church of England Grammar School was issued, and on 3 August in that year the school, named "The Hutchins School" in memory of Archdeacon William Hutchins, was opened at Hobart, with Buckland as head master. It soon became one of the leading schools of the colony, a position which it has ever since maintained, a large number of the most prominent men of Tasmania having received their education at the Hutchins School. Buckland held the post of headmaster for twenty-eight years, until his death, which took place at Hobart on 13 October 1874.

References

1819 births
1874 deaths
Australian schoolteachers